Acanthops royi is a species of praying mantis in the family Acanthopidae and is one of many mantis from various genera that resembles a dead leaf.

See also
Dead leaf mantis
List of mantis genera and species

References

Acanthopidae
Mantodea of South America
Insects described in 2004